George Stanley Turnbull (December 5, 1882 – February 9, 1977) was an English-American scholar and educator. He began a career of newspaper work in 1894 and helped found the University of Oregon School of Journalism in 1917, later serving as acting dean and, from 1944 to 1948, as dean. He founded and edited Oregon Exchanges, a newspaper for Oregon's "newspaper folk," which was at least initially produced by students at the School of Journalism.

Turnbull published five books, including the 1939 History of Oregon Newspapers, which was identified in the Eugene Register-Guard in 1950 as the "most authentic source on newspapering in the state." He presented at the 15th annual Oregon State Editorial Association conference, which was described at the time as the most successful conference to date. The work has been cited as an authority in numerous sources.

Following his retirement from teaching journalism, Turnbull worked for several newspapers, and taught at several universities. He died February 9, 1977, in Salem, Oregon. His son-in-law, Democratic bureaucrat and politician Ken Johnson, worked on a biography of Turnbull for about a year around the time of his death.

References

External links 
 Thomas Bivins on UO School of Journalism history

Writers from Oregon
University of Oregon faculty
1882 births
1977 deaths